James Patrick Ferry (born 20 April 1997) is an English retired semi-professional footballer who played as a central midfielder. He is a product of the Brentford academy and played in the EFL for Stevenage, before dropping into non-League football in 2019 and retiring from football in 2021.

Career

Brentford 
Ferry began his youth career at Brentford and captained the Bees' U15 team during the 2012 Milk Cup, leading the side to victory in the Junior category. Despite missing much of the 2012–13 season with injury, he signed a scholarship deal in May 2013. He made 33 appearances and scored six goals during his two seasons as a scholar and captained the youth team to the 2014–15 Professional U18 Development League 2 Final.

Ferry signed a one-year Development Squad contract in June 2015 and began the 2015–16 season as a near ever-present in the Professional U21 Development League 2 South, impressing enough to sign a new one-year contract extension in November 2015. On 26 November 2015, Ferry joined League Two club Wycombe Wanderers on a one-month loan, but failed to win a call into a squad before his loan expired. Ferry joined National League strugglers Welling United on a one-month loan on 28 January 2016 and made seven appearances before his loan expired.

Ferry received his maiden call into a Brentford first team squad for a Championship match versus Ipswich Town on 9 April 2016 and remained an unused substitute during the 3–1 victory. He was a regular in the B team during the 2016–17 season and helped the team to win the Kai Thor Cup, but failed to win any further first team call ups before departing Griffin Park in May 2017.

Stevenage 
On 12 May 2017, Ferry joined League Two club Stevenage on a two-year contract for an undisclosed fee. He made three EFL Trophy appearances before joining National League North club Nuneaton Town on a one-month loan on 15 December 2017. The loan was later extended until the end of the season. On 27 February 2018, Ferry scored the first senior goal of his career with the opener in a 2–1 victory over A.F.C. Telford United. He finished his spell with 22 appearances and two goals.

Ferry was a regular inclusion in the first team squad during the first three months of the 2018–19 season and made 15 appearances, mostly as a substitute, before joining National League club Halifax Town on a 93-day loan on 15 December 2018. He made 12 appearances and scored two goals during his spell. Shortly after his return in March 2019, he transferred away from Stevenage. In just under two seasons with the club, Ferry made 18 appearances.

Woking 
On 28 March 2019, Ferry joined high-flying National League South club Woking on a contract until the end of the 2018–19 season. He made six appearances in what remained of the regular season, but did not feature in the Cards' successful playoff campaign. Ferry was released at the end of the season.

Eastbourne Borough 
On 21 June 2019, Ferry joined National League South club Eastbourne Borough on a one-year contract. He made 64 appearances and scored two goals during the 2019–20 and 2020–21 seasons, both of which were abandoned due to COVID-19. Ferry was retained for the 2021–22 season. On 5 December 2021, Ferry mutually agreed to terminate his contract with Eastbourne after struggling with the commute from his West London home. He ended his -year career with the club on 77 appearances and two goals and subsequently retired from football due to work commitments.

Personal life 
Ferry attended Enfield Grammar School.

Career statistics

References

External links 
 

1997 births
Living people
English footballers
Association football midfielders
Welling United F.C. players
National League (English football) players
Stevenage F.C. players
Nuneaton Borough F.C. players
People from Enfield, London
FC Halifax Town players
Woking F.C. players
Eastbourne Borough F.C. players
People educated at Enfield Grammar School